SJK(T) Bandar Mentakab is a national-type Tamil primary school located in Mentakab, Temerloh, Pahang, Malaysia. SJK (T) Mentakab is one of the main primary schools in Mentakab. The school is known for its excellent results in the UPSR nationwide examinations. It is also one of the best primary schools in Pahang through the UPSR results and co-curriculum activities.

List of school principals

Classes
The name of classes will be change followed by changes in school principal.

Standard

Awards
Champion in National Level Inter Tamil School Debate Competition

Notable alumni

External links

Primary schools in Malaysia
Publicly funded schools in Malaysia
Tamil-language schools in Malaysia
Educational institutions established in 1939
1939 establishments in British Malaya